Enopliinae is a subfamily of beetles in the family Cleridae.

Genera 
Apolopha – Apteropilo – Boschella – Chariessa – Corinthiscus – Cregya – Curacavi – Enoplium – Exochonotus – Lasiodera – Neopylus – Neorthopleura – Pelonides – Pelonium – Parapelonides – Phymatophaea – Platynoptera – Pseudichnea – Pylus – Pyticara – Tenerus

References 

 Bartlett, J.S. 2009: Taxonomic revision of Apteropilo Lea, 1908 (Coleoptera: Cleridae). Zootaxa, 2200: 41–53.
 Opitz, W. 2009: Classification and evolution of the genus Phymatophaea Pascoe from New Zealand and New Caledonia (Coleoptera: Cleridae: Enopliinae). Journal of the Royal Society of New Zealand, 39: 85–138.
 Opitz, W. 2010: Classification, natural history, phylogeny, and subfamily composition of the Cleridae and generic content of the subfamilies (Coleoptera: Cleroidea). Entomologica Basiliensia et Collectionis Frey, 32: 31–128.
 Solervicens, J.A. 2005: A prothoracic character that defines the subfamily Korynetinae (Coleoptera: Cleridae). New Zealand entomologist, 28: 49–54. Abstract PDF
 Wolcott, A.B. & H.S. Dybas, 1947: Two new beetles from Costa Rica and Australia with a description of a new Genus (Coleoptera: Cleridae). Fieldiana Zoology 31 (18): 143–148.

External links 
 
 

 
Polyphaga subfamilies